Alexander Gennadyevich Kuznetsov (born November 1, 1973) is a Russian mathematician working at the Steklov Mathematical Institute and the Interdisciplinary Scientific Center J.-V. Poncelet, Moscow, and head of the Laboratory of Algebraic Geometry and its Applications of the Higher School of Economics. He graduated from Moscow State School 57 in 1990. Kuznetsov is known for his research in algebraic geometry, mostly concerning derived categories of coherent sheaves and their semiorthogonal decompositions.

Kuznetsov received an August Möbius fellowship in 1997. He was awarded a European Mathematical Society prize in 2008. He was an invited speaker at the International Mathematical Congress in Seoul (2014). Kuznetsov is a Professor of the Russian Academy of Sciences (RAS), corresponding member of the RAS (elected in 2016).

Selected publications

References

External links
 Official home page
 Google scholar profile
 Math-Net.ru profile
MathSciNet profile

Russian mathematicians
Moscow State University alumni
1973 births
Living people
Corresponding Members of the Russian Academy of Sciences
Academic staff of the Higher School of Economics